The following is a list of games developed by Adventure Soft.

Video games

As Horror Soft

As Adventure Soft

References

Adventure Soft